Lothar van Gogh  ( – ) was a Dutch footballer who played as a forward. He was part of the Netherlands national team, playing two matches and scoring two goals. He played his first match on 14 April 1907.

Van Gogh was the son of Jeanette Louise Vos (1854–1906) and Johannes van Gogh (1854–1913), a coffee grower on Java who was a full cousin of Vincent van Gogh.

A civilian colonial administrator in the Dutch East Indies before capture by the occupying Japanese in World War II, Van Gogh died in one of the Japanese internment camps in Cimahi on Java. He was buried in the Dutch War Cemetery at Leuwigajah at Cimahi.

See also
 List of Dutch international footballers

References

External links
 
 

1888 births
1945 deaths
People from Sukabumi
Dutch footballers
Association football forwards
HFC Haarlem players
Netherlands international footballers
Dutch people who died in Japanese internment camps
Van Gogh family